Joanna Merlin (born Joann Ratner; July 15, 1931) is an American actress and casting director who has worked with Stephen Sondheim and starred in the original Broadway production of Fiddler on the Roof. She has written two acting guides and is a faculty member of New York University's graduate acting program. In recent years, she has become known for her recurring role on Law & Order: Special Victims Unit as Judge Lena Petrovsky.

Early life
Joann Ratner, who later took her mother's maiden name, was born in Chicago, Illinois, to Toni Merlin and Harry Ratner, a Jewish grocer. Her family also included her older sister Harriet Glickman (1926-2020) who would go on to gain recognition for having helped persuade Charles Schulz to add a black character to his Peanuts strip.  Merlin first acted on stage at age 11, joining a community theatre production, Too Many Marys. Merlin graduated from UCLA and later studied under Michael Chekhov, learning his world-renowned acting technique. She has been described as the last student of Michael Chekhov who is still alive and teaching.

Career
Merlin made her first screen appearance in Cecil B. DeMille's film The Ten Commandments in 1956. Five years later, she made her Broadway debut in Becket before playing Tzeitel in Harold Prince's production of Fiddler on the Roof. She left the cast of Fiddler on the Roof before the end of its tour to take care of her two small children but Harold Prince gave her the opportunity to become involved in casting with a more flexible schedule. Company was the first musical for which Merlin served as the casting director. She was also in charge of casting for such plays as Follies, Evita and Sweeney Todd.

In 1986, she served as casting director for the John Carpenter film, Big Trouble in Little China.

After making appearances in several feature films, including the movie Fame, in which she played Miss Olivia Berg, a classical dance teacher; Merlin appeared in the NBC crime drama Law & Order in 1992 as a defense attorney.  Like many actors from that show, she went on to play other characters in the Law & Order franchise - another defense attorney in the original show and a more recurring role as Judge Lena Petrovsky, a judge who was very stern, by-the-book, and has scolded or sanctioned, at various times, ADAs Casey Novak (Diane Neal) and Alexandra Cabot (Stephanie March) and Detective (now Lieutenant) Olivia Benson (Mariska Hargitay), in its first spin-off Law & Order: Special Victims Unit. In the latter role, she appeared in every season between the years 2000 and 2011.

In 2001, Joanna Merlin wrote Auditioning: An Actor-Friendly Guide and in 2007, shared her knowledge of the theatre industry in the instructional video Master Classes in the Michael Chekhov Technique. She teaches in New York University's graduate acting program at the Tisch School of the Arts and in 1999, founded the Michael Chekhov Association where she teaches acting workshops.

Filmography

Film

Television

Stage

Awards and nominations

References

External links
 
 
 

1931 births
American stage actresses
American film actresses
American television actresses
Actresses from Chicago
American casting directors
Women casting directors
Living people
20th-century American actresses
21st-century American actresses
University of California, Los Angeles alumni
Tisch School of the Arts faculty
American people of Jewish descent